Duck House Chinese Restaurant, or simply Duck House, is a Chinese restaurant in Portland, Oregon, in the United States. The 100-seat restaurant opened in 2016.

Reception 
The business was included in Eater Portland's 2022 overview of "Where to Eat and Drink in Downtown Portland".

See also
 List of Chinese restaurants
 History of Chinese Americans in Portland, Oregon

References

External links

 
 

2016 establishments in Oregon
Chinese restaurants in Portland, Oregon
Restaurants established in 2016
Southwest Portland, Oregon